The 2013 FIFA Ballon d'Or Gala was the fourth year for FIFA's awards for the top football players and coaches of the year. The awards were given out in Zürich on 13 January 2014. The deadline for voting was 15 November 2013 but was extended to 29 November 2013 for the first time in history.

Portugal winger Cristiano Ronaldo won the Ballon d'Or award as the World Player of the Year. It was his second Ballon d'Or, after winning the award in 2008, as well as his first FIFA Ballon d'Or. Nadine Angerer was announced as the Women's World Player of the Year recipient, while Jupp Heynckes claimed the World Coach of the Year for Men's Football, and Silvia Neid the World Coach of the Year for Women's Football. The ninety-minute ceremony was hosted by Fernanda Lima along with Ruud Gullit.

Voting
The deadline for voting was 15 November 2013. However, for the first time ever, on 20 November 2013, FIFA announced that voting was extended to 29 November 2013 after not receiving a response of enough eligible voters before the original deadline. The winners were announced on 13 January 2014.

Winners and nominees

FIFA Ballon d'Or
A shortlist of 23 male players was compiled by members of FIFA's Football Committee as well as a group of experts from France Football. It was announced on 29 October 2013.

There were three voters per FIFA member federation: one journalist and the coaches and captain of the national men's team.

The results for the 2013 FIFA Ballon d'Or were:

The following 20 men were originally in contention for the 2013 FIFA Ballon d'Or:

FIFA Women's World Player of the Year
 Nadine Angerer

FIFA World Coach of the Year for Men's Football
 Jupp Heynckes

FIFA World Coach of the Year for Women's Football 
 Silvia Neid

FIFA/FIFPro World XI

FIFA Puskás Award 

 Zlatan Ibrahimović, 4–2 vs , Friends Arena, 14 November 2012

FIFA Presidential Award 
 Jacques Rogge

FIFA Fair Play Award 
 Afghanistan Football Federation

FIFA Ballon d'or Prix d'Honneur 
 Pelé
Pelé was given an honorary Ballon d'Or, having won three FIFA World Cups with Brazil but never an individual award from FIFA, as during his playing career only European-based players were eligible to win the original Ballon d'Or.

Contenders

FIFA Women's World Player of the Year
On 29 October 2012, a 10-player shortlist was unveiled for the FIFA's Women's Player of the Year, which was chosen by experts from FIFA's Committee for Women's Football and the FIFA Women's World Cup and a group of experts from France Football. It was announced on 29 October 2013.

The three finalists for the award, announced on 9 December 2013, are indicated in bold.

FIFA World Coach of the Year for Men's Football
This award will be decided by the same voters and system as that of the men's player award. The shortlist of candidates was announced on 29 October 2013, with the three finalists (indicated in bold type) announced on 9 December 2013.

FIFA World Coach of the Year for Women's Football
This award will be decided by the same voters and system as that of the women's player award. The shortlist was announced on 29 October 2013, and the three finalists (indicated in bold type) were announced on 9 December 2013.

References

External links

FIFA Ballon d'Or 2013 – voting results

2013 in association football
FIFA Ballon d'Or
2013 sports awards
2013 in women's association football
Women's association football trophies and awards